"Nekade Daleku" (in , English translation: Somewhere far away} is a single by Macedonian singer-songwriter Elena Risteska. Originally was recorded in 2006 in Macedonian and included in her second studio album 192, but later in 2008 a Serbian version of the song was recorded too. The name of the Serbian version is "Bye, Bye" and is included in the Elena's first Serbian language album Milioner. Both versions had their official release in May 2008 with a music video.

Release history

References 

Macedonian songs
2006 songs
2008 songs
Songs written by Darko Dimitrov
Songs written by Kaliopi